"Turn Down for What" is a song by French DJ and record producer DJ Snake and American rapper Lil Jon released on December 18, 2013. The song and its viral music video popularized the use of the phrase. The song was particularly successful in North America, where it has earned eight platinum certifications in the United States.

Production and release
Lil Jon and DJ Snake met several years before recording the song. In an interview, DJ Snake said,  Lil Jon said in an interview, In December 2013,  Columbia Records debuted "Turn Down for What" on the label's website. It was released via iTunes shortly afterwards.

Composition
"Turn Down for What" contains the lyrics of Lil Jon rapping "Fire up that loud, another round of shots" and "Turn down for what" throughout the song. It also contains bass and trap music elements that are original to Atlanta, GA, Lil Jon's hometown. "Turn Down for What" is written in the E Phrygian mode and is set in common time at a moderate tempo of 100 beats per minute.

Chart performance
"Turn Down for What" entered the top 10 on Billboards Dance/Electronic chart during the last week of December. In January 2014, the single entered the top 5 on the Dance/Electronic chart and debuted at No. 38 on the Billboard Hot 100. It peaked at number 4 on the chart, becoming DJ Snake's first and Lil Jon's ninth top ten, and was certified gold in February 2014. It reached its first million copies sold in the U.S. in March 2014.  The song reached its 3 million sales mark in July 2014. It became the seventh best-selling song of 2014 in the US with 3,449,000 copies sold for the year.

Critical response
"Turn Down for What" received generally positive reviews from music critics and publications. Rolling Stone voted "Turn Down For What" as the second best song of the year 2014, saying, "The year's nutsiest party jam was also the perfect protest banger for a generation fed up with everything. DJ Snake brings the synapse-rattling EDM and Southern trap music; Lil Jon brings the dragon-fire holler for a hilarious, glorious, glowstick-punk fuck you." In January 2015, "Turn Down for What" was ranked at No. 9, tied with Beyoncés "Flawless", on The Village Voices annual year-end Pazz & Jop critics' poll.

Music video 
An accompanying music video for "Turn Down for What" was directed by the filmmaking duo Daniels, composed of Daniel Kwan and Daniel Scheinert, and released on March 13, 2014. The clip stars co-director Daniel Kwan with Sunita Mani. He explained: "For a while Daniel and I had been wanting to explore male sexuality in a really weird way. For some reason our brains came up with this image, and this other universe where dudes are so pumped up on their own dicks—and they're so into their testosterone—that the way that they show that is by breaking shit with their dicks. So, whatever happens, that would just be a funny logical progression."

Jason Newman of Rolling Stone described the video as "perfect insanity" and added, "It's hard to pinpoint specifically what makes the video for DJ Snake and Lil Jon's 'Turn Down for What' so compelling and ripe for repeat viewings." Edwin Ortiz of Complex called it "incredibly absurd and awesome" and wrote, "The hard-hitting EDM record delivers an undeniable vibe that listeners can't help but mosh out to, and that's clearly evident in the accompanying music video." Writing for Idolator, Robbie Daw said the video "takes things to a whole new level of WTF-ness not quite seen before."

On November 7, 2020, the video surpassed 1 billion views on YouTube.

Remixes 
On April 26, 2014, an official remix featuring Juicy J, 2 Chainz, and French Montana was released. A second official remix, the "Dancehall Remix", followed on April 28, 2014, featuring Chi Ching Ching, Assassin, and Konshens. A third remix was released on May 7, 2014, titled "Turn Down for What (Lil Jon Remix)", featuring Pitbull and Ludacris.

Awards
The music video won Video of The Year and Best Dance Video-International at UK Music Video Awards held in London. It also received 3 additional nominations.

The music video won "Best Direction" at the 2014 MTV Video Music Awards (VMAs) held in Inglewood. It also received 3 additional nominations including MTV Clubland Award, Best Visual Effects and Best Art Direction.

The song was nominated for out of its genre for Choice Music: R&B/Hip-Hop Song at the 2014 Teen Choice Awards held in Los Angeles.

The song won a Billboard Music Award for Top Dance/Electronic Song at the 2015 Billboard Music Awards held in Vegas and the music video won the Clio Bronze in Film and Music at the 2015 Clio Awards.

Usage in media
"Turn Down for What" has been featured in various films, commercials and television programs. Uses include a TV commercial for Sol Republic, to introduce a wireless speaker, which aired in October 2013. The song was used in the films 22 Jump Street, Furious 7 and The Angry Birds Movie 2, and in the trailers for Horrible Bosses 2 and Brick Mansions. The song was also used in a TV spot for the 2019 film, Pokémon Detective Pikachu. In May 2014, Jimmy Fallon, Seth Rogen and Zac Efron danced dressed as girls to the song during an episode of The Tonight Show Starring Jimmy Fallon. In July 2014, Robin Wright also danced to the song during an appearance on The Tonight Show.

In October 2014, Lil Jon and various other celebrities appeared in an online video that featured a remix of the song, renamed to "Turn Out for What", that was organized by Rock the Vote and intended to encourage young people to vote in the upcoming elections.

On October 15, 2014, Michelle Obama posted a video clip of herself dancing to "Turn Down For What" while holding a turnip as a Vine response to US comedian and impressionist Iman Crosson's post hashtagged #AskTheFirstLady. In Alphacat's original post Michelle Obama was asked, "On average how many calories do you burn every time you 'turn up'?!" Her response was "Turnip for what?" The Vine was posted as part of a Q&A organized by the First Lady's office to promote her Let's Move! healthy lifestyle campaign.

In December 2014, a portion of the song was used in an AT&T Wireless commercial announcing the "completion" of their network export's goal of providing improved LTE connectivity.

Starting in 2014, the Houston Texans would play the song every time J. J. Watt recorded a sack.

In March 2015, Disney Channel used the song in a promo for the "Tune in 4 What?" 4 night event, which promoted new episodes of Liv and Maddie, Dog With a Blog, Jessie, Austin & Ally, I Didn't Do It, Girl Meets World, and K.C. Undercover.

In April 2017, the song was featured in a Saturday Night Live commercial parody called "Turtle Shirt".

In November 2017, "Turn Down For What?" was the title of a research paper in the American Journal of Transplantation written by Mary Grace Bowring, Dorry Segev, and colleagues, about the decision to turn down offers of certain deceased donor kidneys for transplantation.

In January 2018, figure skater Jimmy Ma started using the song in his routine.

The song was featured during a montage of an episode from the HBO Max animated sitcom, Close Enough.

In 2021, "Turn Down for What" was used as the soundtrack in a series of TV commercials for British Gas which focused on sustainability.

Charts

Weekly charts

Year-end charts

Decade-end charts

Certifications

References

2013 debut singles
DJ Snake songs
Lil Jon songs
Song recordings produced by Lil Jon
Songs about alcohol
2013 songs
MTV Video Music Award for Best Direction
Songs written by DJ Snake
Columbia Records singles
Viral videos
Trap music (EDM) songs
Hardcore hip hop songs
Electro songs
Houston Texans